The City of Prospect is an inner urban local government area (LGA) in Adelaide, South Australia. Established in 1872, it is one of the oldest local government bodies in South Australia.

The demographics of the suburb show an above-average preponderance of young professionals, and a growing population.

History
Prior to European settlement in 1838, the Prospect area was a tiny part of the traditional lands of the Kaurna people, who lived in small bands across the Adelaide Plains.

To the new settlers, the locality presented a "beautiful prospect", being described as "well timbered, with waving gum and shady trees". Thus Prospect Village was named by Colonel William Light shortly after the colonisation of South Australia in 1838. George Fife Angas was given the right to make first choice of "country section", to which he and other early investors in South Australia were entitled by their purchase of land orders prior to settlement, according to the land division scheme. Prospect was to fall within the Hundred of Yatala when it was proclaimed in 1846, but prior to this the section were simply referred to as "country section" and the number.

At a meeting in March 1838, Angas made his choice, selecting the triangular section 474, now the Collinswood but earlier split between Collinswood and the historic suburb of Rosebery. Later in 1838 further selections were made and six sections (four in the southernmost parts of present-day City of Prospect) were purchased by the Mechanics Land Company, including section 349 in which the village of Prospect arose. The company divided the 80-acre sections into  blocks, and sold them for £10 a block.

Section 348 immediately south of Prospect Village was known as Little Adelaide.

As early as November 1838, plots of land "fronting the new road to the harbour" had been created from subdivisions in the new village of Prospect and were being publicly advertised for sale. These subdivided sections came to be known as Prospect Village. Early attempts to garden in the vicinity of Prospect failed as the soil is naturally dry, the nearest source of water then being the River Torrens. For many years blocks of land in the area remained unfenced and, in springtime, livestock from nearby areas were not prevented from feeding on the thick grass growing on the hills of Prospect.

In the 1840s Prospect Road was called Eliza Street and was not considered a main road, the two main roads heading north from North Adelaide being Main North Road and Lower Main North Road (now Churchill Road). Eliza Street was so named after Eliza Harrington, eldest daughter of James Harrington a local landholder, farmer and businessman.

Establishment of local government
In 1853 the District Council of Yatala was established and included, at its extreme south centre, the future area of the City of Prospect. In 1868 Yatala DC was divided at Dry Creek into the District Councils of Yatala South and Yatala North. On 1 August 1872 the new District Council of Prospect was formed after severing from the Yatala South DC, following lobbying by residents of Prospect village led by council member James Harrington.

Land boom and collapse
In the 1880s there was a land boom in Prospect. Many new subdivisions were made and new houses built. The 1890s saw a collapse of land values and vacant houses were available to rent for just a  few shillings per week.

Municipality
In December 1933, the district council was given municipal status as the Corporation of the Town of Prospect. As such it retained the five pre-existing wards of Nailsworth, Kingston, Fitzroy, St. John's Wood and Highbury, each represented by two councillors. The councillors named in the June 1933 proclamation were: Elder George Whittle as mayor, Leonard Andrew Day for Nailsworth, William Henry Verco for Kingston, Richard Angwin for St. John's Wood, and William Thomas Smith for Highbury, with an instruction that the remaining six vacancies be filled by elections later in that year.

Coat of arms
In 1934 a competition to design a coat of arms for the Town of Prospect was held and a design by Mr. Allan F. Sierp was chosen. It contained the following emblems:
 The first and fourth quarters had shocks of wheat signifying "the early days of the district".
 The second quarter contained a pair of wings to "show the progress to the present prosperity".
 The third depicted a cornucopia, or horn of plenty, overflowing with fruit.

Demographics
The demographics show a growing population: in the 2016 Australian census, there were 20,527 people, up from 19,955 in the 2011 census.

The median age was 37, which was three years younger than the state average. A greater-than-average proportion of the area's population are professionals (30.4%), with 32.6 per cent having received tertiary education of a bachelor's degree or above, compared with the average of 18.5%. Fewer than half (43%) had both parents born in Australia.

Facilities

The Newmarch Gallery, renamed from Prospect Gallery and opened in October 2019 is a nationally recognised exhibition space, run by the City of Prospect. Named in honour of renowned local artist Ann Newmarch , it functions as a place to show a diverse range of contemporary art, with a community focus. Each year, the  Prospect Community Art Exhibition is held in the gallery. Newmarch had a long association with community arts at the Community Association of Prospect and the Prospect Mural Group, and was the first person to be appointed artist-in-residence with City of Prospect.

The Prospect Portrait Prize is awarded biennially at the Newmarch Gallery.

The Prospect Local History Collection was established in 1986, and the Prospect Local History Group meets regularly.

Prospect Library is situated at 128 Prospect Road, and is part of the One Card Network.

Officials
 council members include:

Suburbs

 Broadview - 5083
 Collinswood – 5081
 Fitzroy - 5082
 Medindie Gardens – 5081
 Nailsworth - 5083

 Prospect - 5082
 Ovingham - 5082
 Sefton Park - 5083
 Thorngate - 5082

See also
 Local Government Areas of South Australia
 List of Adelaide suburbs
 List of Adelaide parks and gardens

References

External links
 
 Old Prospectors of South Australia: A Project of Prospect Local History Group
 Prospect Local History Group

Local government areas of South Australia
Local government areas in Adelaide
Prospect, District Council of